George Collings was a carpenter, joiner and author. He is notable for having authored certain key works on the methods and techniques of designing and making situation-specific woodwork.

Still referred to this day, is his book, Circular Work in Carpentry & Joinery, a Practical Treatise on Circular Work of Single and Double Curvature - first published in 1886. A modern edition -  - with a forward and annotations by Karl Shumaker - was published in 1992 by Stobart Davies Ltd. The original preface of the book gives the author's address as "Dover Road, Upper Walmer, Kent".

References

Bibliography 

 
 
 
 
 

British carpenters
Year of birth missing
Year of death missing